Chichibunomiya can refer to:

 Chichibunomiya Rugby Stadium
 Prince Chichibu